The 1930–31 NCAA men's basketball season began in December 1930, progressed through the regular season and conference tournaments, and concluded in March 1931.

Rule changes
If the player with the ball is guarded closely and withholds the ball from play for five seconds, a "held ball" can be called.

Season headlines 

 In February 1943, the Helms Athletic Foundation retroactively selected Northwestern as its national champion for the 1930–31 season.
 In 1995, the Premo-Porretta Power Poll retroactively selected Northwestern as its national champion for the 1930–31 season.

Regular season

Conference winners and tournaments

Statistical leaders

Awards

Consensus All-American team

Major player of the year awards 

 Helms Player of the Year: Bart Carlton, Ada Teachers College (retroactive selection in 1944)

Coaching changes 

A number of teams changed coaches during the season and after it ended.

References